The Dramaturgische Gesellschaft is an association of performing arts workers and students from Germany, Austria and Switzerland. Its headquarters is in Berlin.

Theatre companies in Germany